4MMM (identified on air and in print as Triple M) is a commercial FM rock radio station in Brisbane, Australia. It broadcasts on the Triple M network on 104.5 MHz frequency.

Station history
4MMM started on the FM band at 104.1 MHz on August 22nd, 1980. Brisbane businessman Leo Williams (rugby union) was the driving force behind the venture while the station manager was Rob McKay, who left the station soon after allowing program manager Ted Seymour to take the reins. Their first format was contemporary rock. It was rebranded as FM104 in December 1982 with the new slogan "Rock in Stereo", and focused on the typical Queensland lifestyle of beaches and barbecues.

Their playlists then included AC/DC, The Angels, Van Halen, ZZ Top and the Talking Heads as well as supporting Australian pub rock bands such as INXS, Hunters & Collectors and the Choirboys.

January 10th, 1982 saw the launch of the pioneering program 'incontact,', one of the first christian music programs to feature in ratings time (5 am-12 midnight) at Australia. The Sunday night show held the stations rating audience through to midnight and played weekly through to April 1990. Over 21 Australian premieres and the World Premiere of US rock band Whiteheart's 'Emergency Broadcast' album featured in the music as well as co-promotion of the 1987 Stryper concert at Brisbane's Festival Hall.

During 1983, they started using the popular slogans, "FM104 Rocks the Weekend", "FM104 Rocks Brisbane", and "FM104 Rock in Stereo". The first number one ratings success was in the 7 to midnight time slot in the second survey of 1983, reaching an impressive 26 share. The station finally went number one overall in October 1984 with a share of 18.2% total audience.

From then they dominated the market, peaking at a massive 37.9% share in the Brisbane expo year, 1988. This has never been achieved by any radio station since. They were number one in Brisbane from late 1984 until 1990. The breakfast shift, with Bill Healy and Mr T was also consistently number one. Promotions including the Skyshow featuring the first afterburner F111's in the world, and involvement in all things Brisbane supplemented the sizzling on-air format.

During their 1980's domination FM104 also pioneered cross-platform endeavours, noteworthy the weekly late night music show "Sevenrock in Stereo" hosted by programmer Bill Riner. Sevenrock was a simulcast with BTQ Channel 7 broadcasting monaural video and FM104 the stereo sound. Other simulcast ventures included Star Wars with TVQ Channel 0.

In 1988, Hoyts Entertainment, the new owners of the station, forced FM104 to take on the Triple M brand to become part of the newly created Triple M nationwide network. From then on it became known as FM104 Triple M, maintaining its callsign 4MMM. A change of frequency to 104.5 MHz occurred on 5 November 1989.

During 1990, management and staff changes started a slide. Triple M was finally toppled from the top spot by new FM station B105, with the onset of rap and dance music. When the Austereo group purchased the station as part of its takeover and merger of the Triple M and Today networks in 1995 the FM104 tag was dropped, however the FM104 Tag has resurfaced recently in station sweepers and jingles along with some retrospective commentary by announcers.

In April 2011 the regional media giant Southern Cross Media bought the Austereo group for more than $700 million. Southern Cross Media is the current owner of the Triple M network, and all Triple M branded stations are now operated under the parent company Southern Cross Austereo.

Studios
The FM104 studios were originally based on the top floor of 67 St Pauls Terrace. Not much is known about the original installation.

New facilities were later created at 549 Queen Street, Brisbane. This building had a lot of character, featuring a quirky lift, green carpets and a distinctive spiral staircase linking the two floors. The basement carpark, reserved for executives and station vehicles, was tiny and difficult to enter and exit. The building also hosted some wild survey parties with many famous guests over many years.

The Queen Street equipment comprised MTE mixing consoles, and ITC Delta cartridge machines. FM104 Triple M never experienced the era of "Digital Commercial System" (DCS) which was incorporated into most other Austereo stations. Instead, FM104 Triple M continued to use outdated cartridge machines until 1999, when the updated Maestro digital play out system was installed as part of an Austereo nationwide upgrade.

From 1998 to 2000, Triple M's news was broadcast from the newsroom of sister station B105 FM in a combined newsroom arrangement. A high-speed microwave WAN link was also installed between the two stations to enable data connectivity.

FM104, and later Triple M Brisbane, broadcast from the Queen Street location until August 2000, when Austereo relocated Triple M and sister station B105 into new combined premises at 309 North Quay, Brisbane.

The new complex was the first in Australia to use the now defunct Klotz Digital VADIS audio system, which was revolutionary at the time. After 16 years the original Klotz installation at the North Quay facility was phased out and replaced with an Axia Audio over IP system manufactured by US based Telos Systems.

Southern Cross Austereo has announced that in 2019 4MMM and B105 will move into new facilities at The Barracks

Transmission
FM104 originally transmitted using two RCA BTF-20E 20 kilowatt transmitters in an A/B failsafe configuration running from the BTQ Seven tower at Mt Coot-tha, Brisbane. An increase in Effective radiated power was granted in the early 1990s, and an arrangement was reached with rival station B105 to share a new antenna, combiner, and floor space at TVQ Ten, which had a higher tower.

An Electronics Research Inc (ERI) FM array was installed on the tower, combined through an RF combiner to allow both 105.3 (B105) and 104.5 (4MMM) to transmit at 5 kW base power on the same array. 4MMM had a 20 kW RCA transmitter moved from the BTQ site and an NEC 10 kW transmitter installed at this site, in an A/B failsafe configuration. One of the original 20 kW RCA transmitters was left in place at BTQ seven as a backup, leaving 4MMM as one of the most redundant ready stations in Brisbane, with three transmitters to choose from and two different transmission sites.

4MMM continued to use the same transmitter configuration until 2002. After the merger with B105 FM which had two Harris HT10 transmitters operating in A/B failsafe, an upgrade was done which saw a new solid state Harris Z10CD transmitter tuned to 104.5 Mhz installed at the newly created TX Australia facility under the TVQ Ten tower. Both original RCA transmitters were sold for scrap, and the NEC transmitter eventually went to Broadcast Australia for parts.

As of June 2012, Triple M Brisbane has one Harris Z10CD solid state transmitter as the main, located at TVQ Ten. It has one HT10FM tube transmitter as the secondary, located at BTQ Seven. There is also a spare antenna (the original B105 FM1C) at the TVQ Ten tower if needed.

TX Australia are currently under contract to maintain all of Austereo Brisbane's FM transmission infrastructure including antennas, transmitters and combiners.

Broadcast Australia are under contract to maintain the digital radio infrastructure for all Brisbane radio stations.

4MMM's FM base power is 5 kilowatts with an ERP (Effective Radiated Power) of 12 kilowatts at the antenna. The digital radio base power from the Mt Coot-tha site is 1.8 kW with an ERP of 12 kW at the antenna.

25th Anniversary Celebration

In August 2005, 4MMM held a weekend long celebration of 25 years broadcasting. Archived audio was played back, including interviews with former programmer Bill Riner and other former DJ's.

The weekend culminated in a Sunday afternoon broadcast from the station's carpark at 309 North Quay, with drinks, food, and live to air performances from The Screaming Jets, The Choirboys and Glenn Shorrock. The single 'Cool Change' from Shorrock's 'Little River Band' was the first song ever played to air on 4MMM.

Football

AFL

4MMM broadcasts full call of AFL matches played by the Brisbane Lions. 4MMM's football calls are overseen by Triple M Head of AFL Ewan Giles. 4MMM's AFL calls are relayed into other Triple M interstate stations as required. Other interstate matches are called by different commentary teams and networked into Brisbane.

NRL

4MMM broadcasts full commentary of selected NRL matches. These games are generally played on Thursday, Friday, Saturday, Sunday and Monday nights and are broadcast live from the relevant stadiums. Brisbane matches held at Suncorp Stadium are often hosted by lead commentator Anthony Maroon, and feature special comments by former Brisbane Broncos player Gorden Tallis and sideline updates from Ben Dobbin.

Networking
As with most national radio networks, 4MMM sometimes engages in networking of several shows.

There are two shows currently networked on 4MMM.

  The Night Shift with Luke Bona – 12am – 5:30am Weekdays

Digital Radio
Triple M is simulcast on Digital Radio in Brisbane. It is hosted on Ensemble 2 with all of Southern Cross Austereo's digital offerings.

In 2018, Triple M Launched "Triple M Soft Rock", which played mostly 80's pop-rock, and regular stadium rock, available on DAB+ and on the Triple M App. In 2022, it became "Triple M 80's", to reflect better on what it played.

References

External links
 Triple M website
 Triple M Brisbane PodCast (all shows) or subscribe with iTunes

Radio stations in Brisbane
Active rock radio stations in Australia
Radio stations established in 1980
Radio stations on the Gold Coast, Queensland
1980 establishments in Australia